The PO Corrèze (POC) is a former metre-gauge railway in the Corrèze department in central France. The concession was granted to the Chemin de Fer de Paris à Orléans (PO) and constructed by the Société de Construction des Batignolles. Together with the Chemin de fer du Blanc-Argent and the Blois à Saint Aignan, they formed the metre-gauge network of the PO.

The centre of the railway was at Tulle, where there was a connection with the SNCF, and consisted of three lines:
 From Tulle, north to Uzerche and a connection with the standard gauge PO (later SNCF) lines,
 From Tulle, south to Argentat,
 From Seillac, a branch headed east to Treignac.

There was also a connection with the Tramways de Corrèze (TC) at Saint Bonnet Avalouze. TC used POC tracks to reach Tulle.

The entire line was opened in 1904. It was closed to passengers on 3 November 1969 and to freight on 31 May 1970.

Steam traction was used throughout the duration of operation. Diesel traction appeared in the 1930s for passenger service in the form of autorails (railcars). Diesel locomotives arrived in 1962 to power the freight trains.

Permanent way

Due to the difficult terrain, it was necessary to build a number of bridges, viaducts and tunnels.
Tulle–Uzerche
Viaduct of 7 arches of 10 m across the Cérrone, length 
Viaduct of 5 arches of 8.5 m across the Cérrone, length 
Viaduct of 5 arches of 10 m across the Cérrone, length 
Viaduct of 4 arches of 10 m across the Vézère, length 
Viaduct of 11 arches of 10 m and one of 12 m across the GC3, length 
 long Tulle Tunnel
 long Puy l'Évêque Tunnel,
 long Sainte Eulalie Tunnel,

Tulle–Argentat
 long steel bridge over the Corrèze (river)
Viaduct of 4 arches of 10  across the Corrèze, length 
 long Pandrines Tunnel.

Stations

The station buildings were built in the style of the PO, with a combined station house and goods shed, with the roof extended over the loading dock. The stations at Tulle and Uzerche shared facilities with the SNCF.  

Tulle–Argentat
Tulle
Laguenne
Saint-Bonnet-Avalouse
Pandrignrd - Saint Paul
Saint-Sylvian (Corrèze)
Forgès
Saint-Chamas (Corrèze)
Argentat

Tulle–Uzerche
Tulle
Naves
Saint Clément - Lagraulière
Seilhac
Saint-Jul
Uzerche

Seilhac–Treignac
Seilhac
Chamboulive
Le Lonzac
Treignac

Rolling stock

Steam locomotives

Ten 2-4-0 tank locomotives were built by the Société de Construction des Batignolles for the opening of the line. Four 0-4-4-0 Mallet tank locomotives were ordered from Ateliers de construction du Nord de la France (Blanc-Misseron), who subcontracted the order to Ateliers de Tubize.

Diesel locomotives
 401–402, 32-tonnes loco-tractors built by CFD Montmirail and delivered on 1962.

Autorails (railcars)
 X 211 and X 212, type X 210 built by SCF Verney in 1951

Carriages and wagons
Passenger carriages
 38 four-wheel carriages with outside platforms
 1 first-third composite saloon AC2f No. 1
 11 28-seat first-third composites AC3 Nos. 2–10, AC3f Nos. 11–12
 18 39-seat third class AC4f Nos. 21–38
 9 passenger luggage vans DPf Nos. 51–59
Goods vehicles
Covered van K 96–100, 5.5 tonnes, 1904
Covered van K 101–125, 5.5 tonnes, 1904, series saw service on the Chemins de fer départementaux de la Meuse
Covered van with brake compartment Kf 126–140, 6 tonnes, 1906
Covered van with brake compartment Kf 141–150, 6 tonnes, 1908
Open wagon I 201–225, 5 tonnes, 1904
Open wagon I 226–230, 5 tonnes, 1908
Open wagon I 231–245, 5 tonnes, 1925
Flat wagon HH 301–320, 4 tonnes, 1904
Flat wagon with brake, HHf 321–335, 4 tonnes, 1904
Flat wagon with brake, HHf 336–350, 4 tonnes, 1912
Flat wagon, HH 351–356, 4 tonnes, 1904
Flat wagon (sleepers), L 401–402, 4 tonnes, 1904

Additional stock
A number of vehicles have also run on the PO-Corrèze
De Dion-Bouton autorails from the Réseau des Tramways de l'Ain, Nos. 51–56
An 0-6-6-0 Mallet tank locomotive from the Chemin de Fer du Blanc-Argent, No. 41
Billard type A 80D autorail from the Réseau de la Dordogne, CFD Nos. 601–605, 607, 609, 611
Three bogie passenger carriages from the Tramways de la Sarthe, Nos. B 39–41
Four Billard type A 80D from the Chemin de Fer du Blanc-Argent in 1968, Nos. 31–32, 311–312
A railcar and trailer from the Réseau Breton, Nos. X 153 and RL 5
Approximately 100 goods wagons from the Réseau Breton
Four sleeper flat wagons from the Chemin de Fer du Blanc-Argent, Nos. 501–502, 601–602

Notes and references

Bibliography
 « Le PO Corrèze », dans Chemins de Fer Régionaux et Urbains, vol. 1969-III, no 93, Mai-Juin 1969

Compagnie du chemin de fer de Paris à Orléans
Metre gauge railways in France